Denaturation  may refer to:
Denaturation (biochemistry), a structural change in macromolecules caused by extreme conditions
Denaturation (fissile materials), transforming fissile materials so that they cannot be used in nuclear weapons
Denaturation (food), intentional adulteration of food or drink rendering it unfit for consumption while remaining suitable for other uses

See also
Denatured alcohol, also known as methylated spirit
Denaturalization, the reverse of naturalization, when a state deprives one of its citizens of his or her citizenship